Diana Mammadova (born 5 March 1998) is an Azerbaijani footballer who plays as a defender for the Azerbaijan women's national team.

International goals

See also
List of Azerbaijan women's international footballers

References

1998 births
Living people
Women's association football defenders
Azerbaijani women's footballers
Azerbaijan women's international footballers
Russian Women's Football Championship players
FC Yenisey Krasnoyarsk players
Azerbaijani expatriate footballers
Azerbaijani expatriate sportspeople in Russia
Expatriate women's footballers in Russia